Nic Henderson (born 1 May 1981), is an Australian rugby union player. He played with the Brumbies before joining the Melbourne Rebels for the 2011 and 2012 Super Rugby seasons. He also has three test caps.

Henderson retired after the 2013 Super Rugby season.
Henderson holds a Super Rugby record for playing the most games without scoring a try (119 games).

Henderson previously played rugby league, joining the Melbourne Storm ahead of the 2001 NRL season, playing for feeder club Norths Devils in the Queensland Cup.

References

External links
 Melbourne Rebels Player Profile
 itsrugby.co.uk profile

1981 births
Living people
Australian rugby union players
Australia international rugby union players
Melbourne Rebels players
ACT Brumbies players
Western Force players
Rugby union props
Melbourne Rebels coaches
Rugby union players from Queensland